is a 1958 Japanese satirical comedy film directed by Yasuzo Masumura and starring Hiroshi Kawaguchi.

Plot
Candy manufacturer World competes with companies Giant and Apollo over caramel sales. While looking for a poster girl for a new promotional campaign, chief of advertising Goda discovers Kyoko, a working class girl with bad teeth, and makes her World's mascot, dressed up in a space suit and wielding a ray gun. Meanwhile, Goda's assistant Nishi, at the instruction of his boss, has an affair with Apollo's advertising lady Kurahashi to learn about their campaign plans. As Kyoko's popularity rises to unprecedented heights, the young woman is less and less inclined to go along with World's plans for her, working on a career as a singer and dancer. After Kyoko terminates their contract, Goda, cracking up and sick from professional stress to the point of coughing up blood, wants to take over her role. Nishi, worried about his boss's health, stops him and takes over the role of the mascot himself. Dressed in Kyoko's spacesuit and wielding a ray gun, Nishi patrols the streets, followed by Kurahashi who prompts him to smile a bright smile for the passers-by.

Cast
 Hiroshi Kawaguchi as Yōsuke Nishi
 Hitomi Nozoe as Kyoko Shima
 Yūnosuke Itō as Junji Harukawa
 Michiko Ono as Masami Kurahashi
 Kyu Sazanka as Takakura Higashi
 Kinzo Shin as Kohei
 Hideo Takamatsu as Ryuji Goda

Production
Giants and Toys was a short story written by Takeshi Kaikō. After Kaikō won the Akutagawa Prize in 1957 for The Naked King, Daiei Film bought the rights to Giants and Toys. The story was an entry in the "business novel" (経済小説, keizai shōsetsu) genre, which satirizes Japanese workers' devotion to their corporations.

Legacy
In the British Film Institute's list of the best Japanese films from 1925 to the present, reviewer Jasper Sharp describes Giants and Toys as a "deliciously wicked satire on the new cut-throat competitiveness of the postwar corporate world" and a "marker point of modernist cinema".

References

External links

Bibliography
 

1958 films
1958 comedy films
Japanese comedy films
Films based on short fiction
Films directed by Yasuzo Masumura
Daiei Film films
1950s Japanese films